Qarapapaqs, are a Turkic sub-ethnic group of Azerbaijanis.
 Qarapapaq, is a village and municipality in the Qazakh Rayon of Azerbaijan.
 Qareh Papaq, is a village in Marhemetabad-e Jonubi Rural District.